The second Wescot-Williams cabinet was the second Cabinet of Sint Maarten installed following the achievement of constituent country status of Sint Maarten within the Kingdom of the Netherlands on 10 October 2010. The cabinet was a coalition between the National Alliance and the Democratic Party, the latter party delivering the Prime Minister despite being the junior partner in the coalition.

The cabinet was formed following the collapse of the first Wescot-Williams cabinet in April 2012, when United Peoples faction leader Romain Laville left his party and became an independent member of parliament. A coalition agreement between the National Alliance and the Democratic Party and I3, consisting of independent MPs Frans Richardson, Patrick Illidge and Romain Laville, was signed on 11 May 2012, and a new cabinet was installed on 21 May 2012.

Composition
The cabinet was composed as follows:

|Prime Minister
|Sarah Wescot-Williams
|DP
|21 May 2012
|-
|Deputy Prime Minister and Minister of Housing, Physical Planning, and Environment
|William Marlin
|NA
|21 May 2012
|-
|Minister of Finance
|Roland Tuitt
|NA
|21 May 2012
|-
|Minister of Justice
|Roland Duncan
|
|21 May 2012
|-
|Minister of Tourism, Economic Affairs, Transport and Telecommunications
|Romeo Pantophlet
|NA
|21 May 2012
|-
|Minister of Healthcare, Social Development, and Labor
|Cornelius de Weever
| DP
|21 May 2012
|-
|Minister of Education, Culture, Youth, and Sports
|Silveria Jacobs
|NA
|21 May 2012
|-
|Minister Plenipotentiary of Sint Maarten
|Mathias Voges
|DP
|21 May 2012
|-
|Deputy Minister Plenipotentiary of Sint Maarten
|Henrietta Doran-York
|NA
|21 May 2012
|}

References

Wescot-Williams II
2012 establishments in Sint Maarten
Cabinets established in 2012
2013 disestablishments in Sint Maarten
Cabinets disestablished in 2013